Sue McCauley (born 1 December 1941 in Dannevirke) is a New Zealand novelist, short story writer, playwright, journalist and screenwriter.

Her first novel was the semi-autobiographical Other Halves (1982), which won both the Wattie Book of the Year Award and the New Zealand Book Award for Fiction. It was adapted into a film, released in 1984 with McCauley credited as screenwriter.

Her manuscript "Landed" was shortlisted for the 2021 Michael Gifkins Prize.

Novels
Other Halves (1982) (Hodder & Stoughton)
Then Again (1986) (Hodder & Stoughton)
Bad Music (1990) (Hodder & Stoughton)
A Fancy Man (1996) (Vintage)
Tropic of Guile (2013) (Xlibris) a commissioned/sponsored novel

Short story collections
It Could be You (1997)
Life on Earth (2003)

These short stories and others have also appeared in numerous publications and anthologies including:
The Best of New Zealand Fiction - vol.3 (2006) and vol.4 (2007)
.. Graminees Review  (2020) A French translation.

Drama (Television Drama, Theatre Radio & Television Plays)

Television Drama
The Shadow Trader (series) (1989)
Shark in the Park (1991) Contributing writer
Marlin Bay (1993) Contributing writer
Mel’s Amazing Movies (1990s) Contributing writer- children’s series
Posy Narkers (1990s) Contributing writer - children’s series
 Family Law Series  (1990s) Educational dramatised videos.

Stage Plays
Waiting for Heathcliff (1988) (Court Theatre)
Hitting Fifty (2002) (Court Theatre)

Radio Plays
The Obituary (1967)
The Evening Out (1968)
ABC (1970)
Robbie (1972)
Crutch (1975)
Minor Adjustment (1975)
Letters to May (1977)
The Ordinary Girl (1978)
When Did He Last Buy You Flowers? (1980)
The Missionaries (1981)
Isobel, God and the Cowboy (1981)
The Ezra File (1982)
Thank You Buzz Aldrin (1982)
The Man Who Sleeps With his Mother (1983)
The Ezra File (1982)
Family Ties (1986)
Waiting for Heathcliff (1989) - note: this is an adaption of stage play
..The Voice Despised (1989
Rescue Remedy (1990)
The Upward Mobility of Gordon Reddy (1998) (shortlisted for the Mobil Radio Awards)

Television Plays
As Old As The World (1968)
Friends and Neighbours (1974)

Film Scripts
Feature Films
Other Halves (1986) note: this is an adaption of the novel "Other Halves" which was written by Sue McCauley

Short Films
Married (1993) 
Matrons of Honour (1994)
"Food for Thought" (2015) Adaption of short story "The Assassin Bug".

Journalism/ Non-Fiction
Non-Fiction
Escape from Bosnia; Aza’s Story (1966) (Shoal Bay Press) as told to Sue McCauley by Aza Mehmedovic

Columns
Hers (late 1960s) (NZ Listener)
Sue McCauley On... (1970s) (Thursday Magazine)
Lives  (1988-9) (NZ Listener)

Autobiographical Essays (anthologised)
My Father and Me (1993) (Tandem Press)
Cherries on a Plate (1996) (Vintage)

Other
contributor to New Zealand Heritage (1971) (historical periodical)
contributor and TV reviewer (1970-80) (NZ Listener)
Book reviewer (1990s) (New Zealand Books  - a literary magazine)
Reporter for - and part owner of - Waiheke Island's Gulf News (1974 -79)

Awards
Wattie Book Award (1982) 
Mobil Radio Award (1982) 
New Zealand Book Award (1983) 
Queen’s Service Medal (1986) as published in the Supplement to the New Zealand Gazette of
Thursday, 9 January 1986

Fellowships
Auckland University writer-in-residence (1986) 
Canterbury University writer-in-residence (1993) 
Hagley College writer-in-residence (2000) 
The Foxton Fellowship (2005)

Book Editing (anthologies)
Erotic Writing -  (1992) (Penguin) co-authored by Richard McLachlan
Mind & Mirror -  (1994) (Orca Publishing Service) writing by women imprisoned
Totally Devoted - (2002) (Harper Collins) true stories by readers of The Women's Weekly.
A Magpie Stole My Heart (2003) (Whitireia Publishing) writing contributed by Whitireia students.

Journalism Employment
Copywriter, New Zealand Broadcasting Corporation (1958 - 1960) note: Sue was based in Napier then Wellington
Journalist for the New Zealand Listener weekly magazine (1960 - 61 ) 
Taranaki Herald (1963-64) 
Christchurch Press (1964 -65)

Education
Sue attended Waitahora Primary School near Dannevirke; and then Nelson Girls’ College in the South Island

References

1941 births
20th-century New Zealand novelists
20th-century New Zealand dramatists and playwrights
New Zealand women short story writers
New Zealand women novelists
People from Dannevirke
Living people
New Zealand women dramatists and playwrights
20th-century New Zealand short story writers
20th-century New Zealand women writers